Maiolino is a surname. Notable people with the surname include:

Anna Maria Maiolino (born 1942), Italian-Brazilian artist
Wesley Alex Maiolino (born 1988), Brazilian footballer

See also
Maiorino